Chapeau! is a defunct restaurant located in Bloemendaal in the Netherlands. It was a fine dining restaurant that was awarded one Michelin star in the period 2003–2011. In 2012, the restaurant was rewarded two Michelin stars. The retained the two stars until its closure. GaultMillau awarded the restaurant 16.0 out of 20 points.

Last head chef was Jan Sobecky. Former head chefs that earned Michelin stars with Chapeau! were Roland Veldhuizen (2003–2005) and Jeroen Granemann (2005–2009). The restaurant closed down on 1 August 2016.

Chapeau! was a member of Alliance Gastronomique Néerlandaise.

See also
 List of Michelin starred restaurants in the Netherlands

Sources and references 

Restaurants in Bloemendaal
Michelin Guide starred restaurants in the Netherlands
Restaurants established in 1993
1993 establishments in the Netherlands
20th-century architecture in the Netherlands